"Into the Night" is the first single from Santana's 2007 compilation album, Ultimate Santana. The track features Chad Kroeger from Nickelback, who wrote the song. It has received a considerable amount of airplay on VH1. Dania Ramirez of Heroes stars in the music video. The song peaked at number 26 in the United States and number four in Australia.

Track listing
 "Into the Night" (Album version)
 "I Believe It's Time"
 "Curación (Sunlight on Water)"
 "Victory Is Won"
 "Into the Night" (Video)

Music video

The music video features a man (Freddy Rodriguez of Ugly Betty and Six Feet Under) about to jump off a roof when he sees a Colombian girl (Dania Ramirez of Heroes) dancing. He falls for her immediately and starts to follow her. Eventually he follows her to a club where he watches her dance, and at the end they dance together. Meanwhile, Kroeger and Santana play on the roof of the building.

Chart performance
"Into the Night" was a crossover hit as it peaked at number 26 on the Billboard Hot 100, Santana's last top 40 hit to date in the US. In Canada, it was an even bigger hit. It peaked at number two for three consecutive weeks on the Canadian Hot 100. It also reached number four in Australia and number one in Hungary.

Charts

Weekly charts

Year-end charts

Certifications

External links
 Fan Site with info about the song

References

2007 singles
2007 songs
Arista Records singles
Nickelback
Number-one singles in Hungary
Santana (band) songs
Songs written by Chad Kroeger